Zach Richter (born 1984) is an American director, creative director and designer, best known for his work in virtual reality and interactive media.

About 
He attended Maryland Institute College of Art (MICA) and received a B.F.A.

From 2009-2014, Richter gained recognition as a Creative Director with Saatchi & Saatchi and Stopp/LA (USA), where he worked closely with adidas, Toyota, Google, Intel, Starbucks and others to help create and launch their global integrated campaigns.

In 2013, Richter collaborated with Chris Milk and musician Beck to create the world's first ever 360° live action virtual reality film, "Sound & Vision" which premiered at Sundance Film Festival.

In 2015, Richter and Milk directed The New York Times virtual reality documentary "Walking New York" about French artist JR (artist).

In 2017, Richter directed 'Hallelujah,' the world's first Light Field VR music experience, shot with over 550 cameras using Lytro Immerge technology. Hallelujah premiered nationally at Tribeca Film Festival and Internationally at Cannes Film Festival. In 2017, he was also nominated for an Emmy for an interactive music video he directed for The Chemical Brothers called "Under Neon Lights."

Richter's work has been shown at Sundance, Tribeca, SXSW and Cannes film festivals, and has been honored with the highest awards in creativity and technology at Cannes Lions, The Webby Awards, and Clio Awards.

Richter is currently the creative director of Within, a virtual reality company founded by Chris Milk and Aaron Koblin. Since 2019, he has worked on 'Supernatural,' a first-of-its-kind Virtual Reality fitness experience for the Oculus Quest. Supernatural was named one of Time Magazine's "Best Inventions of 2020" and was the winner of Fast Company's "Best App or Game of 2020."

Virtual Reality experiences and films

Selected interactive works for brands
• GE: "The Possible" (2017)

• Intel: "What Lives Inside" (2015)

• adidas: "I am Brazuca" (2014)

• adidas: "miZXFlux" (2014)

• Starbucks: "Meet Me at Starbucks" (2014)

• Chrysler: "Beneath The Surface" (2014)

• Honda: "Project Drive-In (2013)

• Lincoln: "Hello, Again" (2012)

• Range Rover: "The Trail Less Traveled (2012)

References

American filmmakers
1984 births
American graphic designers
Maryland Institute College of Art alumni
Virtual reality
Living people